Trinity is a census-designated place (CDP) in Pasco County, Florida, United States.  The population was 10,907 in 2010, according to the most recent census. The Trinity Community is named after Trinity College of Florida, a Bible college founded in 1932, when it relocated to the first occupied site in the communities developed by James Gills in the late 1980s. The main plaza is found near the high school, known as Mitchell Ranch Plaza. Trinity is located at the junction where Pasco, Hillsborough and Pinellas Counties meet. The community of Longleaf is located in Trinity and it is believed that the “Welcome Plank” originated in Longleaf.

Geography
Trinity is located at  (28.177854, -82.671139).

Trinity is a community just north of the Pinellas and Hillsborough county borders in West Pasco County. It is currently considered part of the New Port Richey area.

The town of Trinity consists of higher priced single family homes and two luxury apartment complexes. A majority of Trinity is the Trinity Communities, which is made up of Champions Club, Trinity Oaks, Thousand Oaks, Wyndtree, Chelsea Place, Natures Hideaway, Foxwood, Trinity West and East, Heritage Springs and The Villages Of Trinity Lakes. Pasco County Fire-Rescue Station #17 covers most of Trinity and Station #15 has some areas. The Pasco County Sheriff's office is the primary law enforcement agency, with the Florida Highway Patrol covering some major roadways.

Demographics

As of the census of 2000, there were 4,279 people, 1,683 households, and 1,479 families residing in the CDP. The racial makeup of the CDP was 96.03% White, 0.68% African American, 1.71% Asian, 0.02% Pacific Islander, 0.42% from other races, and 0.84% from two or more races. Hispanic or Latino of any race were 2.83% of the population.

There were 1,683 households, out of which 27.5% had children under the age of 18 living with them, 82.6% were married couples living together, 4.0% had a female householder with no husband present, and 12.1% were non-families. 9.7% of all households were made up of individuals, and 5.2% had someone living alone who was 65 years of age or older. The average household size was 2.54 and the average family size was 2.71.

In the CDP, the population was spread out, with 20.6% under the age of 18, 2.8% from 18 to 24, 24.1% from 25 to 44, 31.7% from 45 to 64, and 20.8% who were 65 years of age or older. The median age was 47 years. For every 100 females, there were 93.6 males. For every 100 females age 18 and over, there were 92.0 males.

The median income for a household in the CDP was $68,883, and the median income for a family was $72,365. Males had a median income of $57,375 versus $31,384 for females. The per capita income for the CDP was $31,187. About 1.8% of families and 2.1% of the population were below the poverty line, including none of those under age 18 and 1.9% of those age 65 or over.

Education
The public schools serving the Trinity area belong to the Pasco County School District. The serving school district elementary schools include Trinity Elementary School, Trinity Oaks Elementary School, Longleaf Elementary School, Odessa Elementary School, and Athenian Academy of Technology and the Arts (charter school). Kids also attend Seven Springs Middle School and J.W. Mitchell High School. Trinity private schools include Elfers Christian School, Genesis School, Solid Rock Community School and Genesis Preparatory School. Trinity College of Florida, a 4-year private Christian college, is also located here.

Airport
Trinity once shared a small airport with Odessa, FL. The Tampa Bay Executive Airport, at the corner of Trinity Blvd and SR 54, closed in 2004. Today, residents must use either Tampa International Airport or St. Pete/Clearwater International Airport.

References

External links
 Welcome Guide to Trinity Florida
 Pasco County Fire Rescue 
 City-Data.com: Trinity
 Trinity Communities Master Plan

Census-designated places in Pasco County, Florida
Census-designated places in Florida